The 1983–84 FIRA Trophy was the 24th edition of a European rugby union championship for national teams.

The tournament was won by France, with a Grand Slam. Romania, Italy and Soviet Union finished in the following places, with the same points. The French only awarded caps in their win over Romania (25-15). Poland and Morocco finished in the 5th and 6th places and were relegated.

Spain and Tunisia won the Second division pools and were promoted for the following season.

First division 

Morocco and Poland relegated to division 2

Second division

Pool A 

Spain promoted to division 1

Pool B 

Tunisia promoted to division 1

Bibliography 
 Francesco Volpe, Valerio Vecchiarelli (2000), 2000 Italia in Meta, Storia della nazionale italiana di rugby dagli albori al Sei Nazioni, GS Editore (2000) .
 Francesco Volpe, Paolo Pacitti (Author), Rugby 2000, GTE Gruppo Editorale (1999).

References

External links
1983-84 FIRA Trophy at ESPN

1983–84 in European rugby union
1983–84
1983 rugby union tournaments for national teams
1984 rugby union tournaments for national teams